Birke Häcker (born 1977) is a German legal scholar. Since January 2023 she has been Professor for Civil Law, Common Law and Comparative Law at the University of Bonn and Director of the Institute for International Private Law and Comparative Law at the University of Bonn. From 2016 to 2022, she was the Professor of Comparative Law at the University of Oxford and a Professorial Fellow of Brasenose College, Oxford.

Early life and education
Häcker was born in 1977. She studied law at Brasenose College, Oxford, graduating with a Bachelor of Arts (BA) degree in 2001. She then studied at the University of Bonn, where she completed a Diplom-Jurist (Dipl-Jur) degree in 2004. That year, she also sat and passed the 1st German State Examination in Law. Having returned to Oxford, she completed her Doctor of Philosophy (DPhil) degree in 2007. Her doctoral thesis was titled "Consequences of Impaired Consent Transfers: A Structural Comparison of English and German Law". She sat and passed the 2nd German State Examination in Law in 2011.

Academic career
From 2001 to 2008, Häcker held an elected Examination Fellowship of All Souls College, Oxford. From 2008 to 2016, she was a research associate and then lecturer in law at Ludwig Maximilian University of Munich in Germany. She was also a Senior Research Fellow at the Max Planck Institute for Tax Law and Public Finance in Munich, and a Fifty-Pound Fellow at All Souls College, Oxford, between 2011 and 2016.

In December 2015, it was announced that Häcker would be the next Linklaters Professor of Comparative Law at the University of Oxford in succession to Stefan Vogenauer. She took up the appointment on 1 September 2016. She was additionally so elected a Professorial Fellow in law at Brasenose College, Oxford in 2016. Linklaters Professorship of Comparative Law reverted to the name Professor of Comparative Law at the start of 2018 because Linklaters' funding of the chair had come to an end.

Personal life
Häcker is married to Tobias Reker. Together they have one daughter.

Selected works

References

 

 
 
 

1977 births
Living people
German legal scholars
Fellows of Brasenose College, Oxford
Linklaters Professors of Comparative Law
Alumni of Brasenose College, Oxford
University of Bonn alumni
Fellows of All Souls College, Oxford
Academic staff of the Ludwig Maximilian University of Munich
Scholars of comparative law
Women jurists
Women legal scholars